Emerald Grove is an unincorporated community in the Town of Bradford, in Rock County, Wisconsin, United States. It is located along U.S. Route 14 and  Wisconsin Highway 11 east of Janesville and west of Delavan.

Notable people 

G. F. A. Atherton, member of the Wisconsin State Assembly in the 1st Wisconsin Legislature in 1848, and later a railroad director
Andrew Barlass, member of the Wisconsin State Assembly (1874–76)
William Gardiner, member of the Wisconsin State Assembly (1879)
Robert More, member of the Wisconsin State Assembly (1899-1900)
Thomas Westby, member of the Wisconsin State Assembly (1860)

References

Unincorporated communities in Rock County, Wisconsin
Unincorporated communities in Wisconsin